Mat Dickie (born 1980/1981), professionally known as MDickie, is an English independent video game developer and author. He is best known for his indie professional wrestling games, such as Wrestling Revolution for iOS and Android devices, which received over 100,000 downloads two months after its launch in 2012. The game later went on to surpass 10 million downloads and its sequel, Wrestling Revolution 3D, went on to compete with WWE 2K games on the mobile and PC market.

Dickie began his game development career in 2000 with his first PC game, going on to retire in 2009 to become an educator. He came out of retirement in late 2011 and transitioned to mobile game development, which led to the release of Wrestling Revolution in 2012. However, he once again retired from full-time game development in 2018. In 2019, Dickie confirmed that a new wrestling project was in development for the Nintendo Switch and mobile devices. This project later emerged as Wrestling Empire, which was released in early 2021.

Many of Dickie's games are infamous for their awkward controls and poor graphics. He has mentioned that the low resolution and low poly graphics in his games have allowed for better performance, in turn enabling him "to push a lot of boundaries". The indie and low budget nature of Dickie's games have often contributed to their popularity, leading to Dickie describing himself as being "single-handedly responsible for the worst games to ever be enjoyed by millions of people."

Early life 
Mat Dickie was born in Brigg, North Lincolnshire. His parents worked on a small newsstand, where he stayed while they worked, and boredom drove him to express his creativity by producing makeshift toys for himself with the materials available there. He attended Brigg Primary School. He became interested in developing games at an early age, often sketching out ideas for games. Some of his works were influenced by games he played as a child, including WWF No Mercy, Super Fire Pro Wrestling and WWF WrestleFest.

Dickie also tinkered with Deluxe Paint on his Commodore Amiga until he acquired a PC in 1998, which signaled the beginning of his game development career.

Career

PC game development (2000–2011) 
Dickie began creating his first game after he stumbled across a copy of DIV Game Studio, a programming language that promised to make game development easy. He purchased it from his local Woolworths branch, and spent the summer of 2000 learning it from the examples.

Dickie released his first game, Hardy Boyz Stunt Challenge, in August 2000. The game had the player play as one of the Hardy Boyz, who were wrestlers in the WWF (later renamed the WWE). The game took two weeks to complete and was posted on a wrestling website where it received 15,000 downloads and positive feedback, which inspired him to continue making video games and to make his own website in November 2000 to host his games. He moved to Manchester in 2001 to complete a Bachelor of Science in video games and computers at Salford University. In that same year, he released his first complete game, Federation Online, a flash-based wrestling game.

In 2006, Idigicon, who had previously published one of Dickie's games, Boxer's Story, contacted him again to make a version of his newest release, Wrestling Encore, for the British professional wrestling promotion One Pro Wrestling; however, legal complications arose due to 1PW not having the video game license to the American professional wrestlers working for them. In order to counteract this issue, 1PW attempted to buy the rights to the whole game off of Dickie instead of the rights to sell the version he had created for the promotion at their live shows, with the added benefit of him getting to meet the wrestlers working for the promotion at the time, including Bret Hart and Jeff Jarrett. Dickie declined this offer.

In 2007, Dickie created his first major non-wrestling game, Hard Time, a prison simulator which was named by Games for Windows Magazine as the "Indie Game of the Month". The game was almost released through a subsidiary of THQ. Dickie was also looking forward to develop his wrestling brand with them; however, they felt it was a conflict of interest.

Dickie released The You Testament in early 2009, a game loosely based on the New Testament in which the player follows the life and times of Jesus Christ and his various miracles. Dickie developed it in three months, which PC Gamer said made it the "best worst game ever." He then decided to retire from game development, after realizing that he was unable to meet the increasing expectations of gamers and critics. Dickie subsequently decided to become a developer of educational applications, publishing educational resources on TES. Dickie had ambitions of enhancing learning and making learning fun; however, he later came to the conclusion that entertainment did not have much of a role to play in education. As of 2017, his educational resources have been used in 10,000 classrooms; he was also invited to the 2011 TES awards. He also became an author, writing a book on his game development career and writing others on religion and spirituality as a religious educator.

Mobile and console game development (2011–present) 
In early 2012, Dickie was unemployed, about to buy his first home and awaiting the birth of his first child; this motivated him to come out of retirement and move to developing mobile games, releasing Wrestling Revolution as his first major mobile game. He also released several 2D remakes of his classic PC games on mobile, such as Popscene in 2014, Wrecked, and Hard Time in 2017. His most successful game to date, Wrestling Revolution 3D, reached 50 million downloads in 2017, becoming the first sports game on Google Play to do so.

In July 2018, Dickie once again announced his retirement from full-time game development, citing "frightening intolerance" from digital retailers among other reasons. In an interview, he also cited increasing demands from players after the release of AAA titles such as WWE 2K19. Dickie stated he did not wish to compete directly with WWE games, but intended to provide a "cheaper... lighter... [and] more creative alternative that's always going to be made by one man or a smaller team."

Wrestling Empire 
In 2019, Dickie confirmed that a new wrestling project was in development for the Nintendo Switch and mobile devices. This project was later revealed to be Wrestling Empire, and was released on January 11, 2021. Dickie originally wanted the release to coincide with the 20th anniversary of the release of WWF No Mercy in 2020, which also marked his 20th year as a game developer; however, the COVID-19 pandemic led to him only being able to finish what he approximated to be a third of what he had planned for the game which lead to the project being delayed. Dickie thus decided to release Wrestling Empire in its unfinished state and add additional features through regular updates.  The game has been described as reminiscent of wrestling games on the Nintendo 64, which Dickie drew inspiration from, specifically the era's focus on "gameplay over graphics", which he believes fit his priorities as an indie developer.

Chris Scullion of Nintendo Life gave the game a 6/10 rating, praising the amount of detail put into the large roster, customization options and career mode, while noting the game engine was "laughably prone to botches that you have to get into an equally unhinged mindset to enjoy it." Overall, he saw the game as "overwhelmingly impressive, especially [considering] it was created by a single person."

Works

Video games

PC 
 Hardy Boyz Stunt Challenge (2000)
The Rock's Promo Cutter (2000)
Case 3:16 (2000)
Con-chair-to (2000)
THAT Love Triangle (2000)
Wrestling Vs Boxing (2000)
Big Bumps (2001)
Federation Online (2001)
EEW's Total Annihilation (2001)
Big BumpZ (2001) (Made with dark BASIC)
CVG Strikes Back (2001)
Rocky (2002) (Repackaged as Boxer's Story and later renamed to Arcade Boxing and released by Idigicon)
 Sure Shot (2002)
Sure Shot: Star Wars Edition (2002)
 Federation Wrestling (2002)
Big BumpZ (Made with Blitz 3D)
Federation Booker (2003)
The MDickie Show (2003)
  Wrecked (2004)
 Wrestling MPire 2004 (2004)
 Booking MPire 2004  (2004)
 Popscene (2004)
Sure Shot 3D (2004)
Popcorn (2005)
Wrestling Encore (2005)
Booking Encore (2006)
Grass Roots (2006)
World War Alpha (2006)
Talksport: Clash Of The Titans (2006)
 Hard Time (2007)
 Reach (2007)
 Wrestling MPire 2008: Career Edition (2008)
Wrestling MPire 2008: Management Edition (2008)
Popscene: Track 2 (2008)
 The You Testament (2008)
The Making Of A Prophet (2010)
 Under Development (2011)
 Wrestling MPire Remix (2011)
 Wrestling Revolution 3D (2017)
 Wrestling Empire (2021)

Mobile 
 CM Punk's Promo Cutter (2011)
 Moksha (2011)
 Sure Shot (2011)
 Flash Stuntz (2012)
 Wrestling Revolution (2012)
 Booking Revolution (2013)
 Hard Time (2013)
 Popscene (2014)
 Wrestling Revolution 3D (2014)
 School Days (2015)
 Weekend Warriors MMA (2015)
 Super City (2016)
 Wrecked (2017)
 Extra Lives (2017)
 Back Wars (2018)
The You Testament: The 2D Coming (2018)
Wrestling Empire (2021)

Console 
Wrestling Empire (2021) Nintendo Switch

Books 

 Inspiration for the Interactive Generation (2009)
 Sportuality (2009)
 A-fear-ism: The Ignorance Of Atheism (2010)

References 

British video game designers
1981 births
Living people
People from Brigg
English Christians
Critics of atheism
Date of birth missing (living people)